The 1912 South Australian Football League season was the 36th season of the top-level Australian rules football competition in South Australia.

Ladder

1912 SAFL Finals

Grand Final

References 

SAFL
South Australian National Football League seasons